Archibald Forbes McMinn (14 August 1880 – 23 April 1919) was a New Zealand rugby union player. A loose forward, McMinn represented Wairarapa and Manawatu at a provincial level, and was a member of the New Zealand national side, the All Blacks, from 1903 to 1905. He played 10 matches for the All Blacks including two internationals. His father was Irish journalist Alexander McMinn, who founded the Manawatu Evening Standard newspaper in 1880.

References

1880 births
1919 deaths
People from Marton, New Zealand
New Zealand people of Irish descent
New Zealand rugby union players
New Zealand international rugby union players
Wairarapa rugby union players
Manawatu rugby union players
Rugby union flankers
Rugby union players from Manawatū-Whanganui